The Little Shepherd of Kingdom Come may refer to:

The Little Shepherd of Kingdom Come (novel), 1903 novel by John Fox Jr.
The Little Shepherd of Kingdom Come (1920 film), 1920 film adaptation of the novel
The Little Shepherd of Kingdom Come (1928 film), 1928 film adaptation of the novel
The Little Shepherd of Kingdom Come (1961 film), 1961 film adaptation of the novel